The University of Kansas School of Medicine is a public medical school located on the University of Kansas Medical Center campuses in Kansas City, Kansas, and also Salina, Kansas, and  Wichita, Kansas. The Kansas City campus is co-located with the independent University of Kansas Health System, and they are commonly known collectively as KU Med.

History
Medical instruction in the University of Kansas School of Medicine began in the 1880s with instruction in medical topics in the undergraduate school, influenced principally by chemistry professor Edgar Bailey. Medical degrees were not awarded. The idea was more fully developed when professor Samuel Wendell Williston came to Kansas from Yale in 1890 and proposed that a specific two-year course of study for medicine should be implemented at KU. In 1899, Williston was named the first dean of this two-year program at KU.

The official establishment of the school came in 1905, when the KU Board of Regents authorized the creation of a full four-year medical school at KU, accomplished by merging the existing two-year school in Lawrence with three medical colleges in the Kansas City area. The School of Medicine was officially opened on September 6, 1905.

Wichita campus 
The School of Medicine elected to open a campus in Wichita in 1971. This campus received third and fourth year medical students for their clinical education and these students serve rotations at the Via Christi Health hospitals, Wesley Medical Center, and the Robert J. Dole VA Medical Center. Since 2011, the KU School of Medicine-Wichita has expanded to a four-year campus, serving students in their didactic and clinical education. There are over 200 students and 75 full-time faculty at the KU School of Medicine-Wichita.

The KU School of Medicine-Wichita also sponsors 13 residency programs in coordination with Via Christi Health and Wesley Medical Center. KU School of Medicine-Wichita also operates a multitude of patient care clinics such as Adult Health, Breast Cancer, Endocrinology, Gastroenterology, Internal Medicine, Neurology, Pediatrics, Psychiatry, and Psychology.

In addition to their MD program, the school offers an Office of Research and a Masters in Public Health graduate degree program. The KU-MPH program ranks the sixth best community health graduate degree program in the country by U.S. News & World Report.

Notable alumni
Barney S. Graham, NIH virologist, Zika and COVID-19 vaccine specialist
Jeff Colyer, plastic surgeon and former Governor of Kansas
Debora Green, physician who pleaded no contest to setting a 1995 fire which burned down her family's home and killed two of her children, and to poisoning her husband with ricin 
Paul Harrington, orthopaedic surgeon
Theodore K. Lawless, dermatologist and philanthropist
Roger Marshall, junior United States senator from Kansas
Robert Simari, executive vice chancellor KU Medical Center (2017– )
Kathryn Stephenson, plastic surgeon
George Tiller, physician known for performing late term abortions, homicide victim
Milton R. Wolf, physician
Barbara Bollier, anesthesiologist, Kansas senator and gubernatorial candidate

References

External links
 

Medical schools in Kansas
University of Kansas
Education in Wyandotte County, Kansas
Education in Wichita, Kansas
Educational institutions established in 1905
Buildings and structures in Kansas City, Kansas
Buildings and structures in Wyandotte County, Kansas
1905 establishments in Kansas